Jablanica is a village in the municipality of Rožaje, Montenegro. It is located close to the Serbian border.

Demographics
According to the 2011 census, its population was 471.

References

Populated places in Rožaje Municipality